Oktyabrsky is a rural locality (a settlement) in Sovetskoye Rural Settlement, Kalachyovsky District, Volgograd Oblast, Russia. The population was 3,489 as of 2010. There are 2 streets.

Geography 
Oktyabrsky is located 27 km southeast of Kalach-na-Donu (the district's administrative centre) by road. Komsomolsky is the nearest rural locality.

References 

Rural localities in Kalachyovsky District